Watkin Jones may refer to:

 Wat Jones (1917–1994), a Welsh cricketer
 Watkin Tudor Jones (born 1974), a South African rapper and record producer
 Watkins Jones, an author of Sherlock Holmes and the Occult: The Case of the Scarlet Women
 Watkin Jones plc, a British construction and build to rent company